Nove Ložine is a small settlement northwest of the town of Kočevje in southern Slovenia. The area is part of the traditional region of Lower Carniola and is now included in the Southeast Slovenia Statistical Region.

References

External links
Nove Ložine on Geopedia

Populated places in the Municipality of Kočevje